Mutsuaki Sanada (Shinjitai: 眞田 睦明, born 2 May 1942 – 1 May 2020 ) was a Japanese racing driver.

Racing record

Japanese Top Formula Championship results 
(key) (Races in bold indicate pole position) (Races in italics indicate fastest lap)

References 

1942 births
2020 deaths
Japanese racing drivers
24 Hours of Spa drivers

Long Distance Series drivers